Endzelīns is a Latvian surname that may refer to the following notable people:
Jānis Endzelīns (1873–1961), Latvian linguist
Lūcijs Endzelīns (1909–1981), Latvian chess master, son of Jānis

Latvian-language surnames